Michael C. Dorf is an American law professor and a scholar of U.S. constitutional law. He is the Robert S. Stevens Professor of Law at Cornell Law School.   In addition to constitutional law, Professor Dorf has taught courses in civil procedure and federal courts. He has written or edited three books, including No Litmus Test: Law Versus Politics in the Twenty-First Century, and Constitutional Law Stories, as well as scores of law review articles about American constitutional law. He is also a columnist for Findlaw.com and a regular contributor to The American Prospect. Dorf is a former law clerk to Justice Anthony Kennedy of the U.S. Supreme Court and Judge Stephen Reinhardt of the United States Court of Appeals for the Ninth Circuit.

Life 
Before joining the Cornell faculty in 2008, he was a professor at Columbia University School of Law and, before that, at Rutgers University School of Law in Camden, New Jersey.  He graduated from Harvard College and Harvard Law School. While at Harvard as an undergraduate, he was the American Parliamentary Debate Association national champion. Before attending law school, he contributed to several academic articles in physics. Dorf has advised organizations involved in constitutional litigation, and he has written an amicus brief filed with the United States Supreme Court.

Professor Dorf appears in American news media occasionally as a legal expert, and has been interviewed by and/or quoted in, for example, The New York Times, CNN National Public Radio, and The Daily Show with Jon Stewart. He has also been cited in numerous judicial opinions, including the majority opinion of Justice John Paul Stevens in the Supreme Court case City of Chicago v. Morales. He is a practitioner of blogging, veganism, and juggling.  His deceased wife, Sherry Colb, was also professor of Criminal Law at Cornell Law School.

Books authored or edited by Michael C. Dorf
 No Litmus Test:  Law Versus Politics in the Twenty-First Century, Lanham, Md.: Rowman & Littlefield Publishers, 2006. , 
 Constitutional Law Stories, New York, NY: Foundation Press, 2009. , 
 with Laurence H. Tribe, On Reading the Constitution Cambridge (Mass.) ; London : Harvard University Press, 1992. ,

Selected law review articles authored by Michael C. Dorf
 How to Choose the Least Unconstitutional Option: Lessons for the President (and Others) from the Debt Ceiling Standoff, 112 Columbia Law Review 1175 (2012 (co-author Neil H. Buchanan).
Foreword: Problem-Solving Courts: From Innovation to Institutionalization, 40 American Criminal Law Review 1501 (2003) (co-author Jeffrey A. Fagan).
The Supreme Court 1997 Term—Foreword:  The Limits of Socratic Deliberation, 112 Harvard Law Review 4 (1998).
A Constitution of Democratic Experimentalism, 98 Columbia Law Review 267 (1998) (co-author Charles F. Sabel).
Incidental Burdens on Fundamental Rights, 109 Harvard Law Review 1175 (1996).
Facial Challenges to State and Federal Statutes, 46 Stanford Law Review 236 (1994).

See also 
 List of law clerks of the Supreme Court of the United States (Seat 1)

References

External links
Dorf on Law - Official blog
Profile at Dewey & Leboeuf
Cornell Law School Faculty Profile
Michael C. Dorf:  Amazon.com author's page
Michael C. Dorf:  Findlaw.com columnist page
Michael C. Dorf:  Verdict columnist page

Columbia University faculty
Harvard Law School alumni
Law clerks of the Supreme Court of the United States
Living people
Place of birth missing (living people)
Year of birth missing (living people)
Academic staff of Reichman University
Sentientists
Cornell Law School faculty
Harvard College alumni